The 2017 season was Molde's tenth consecutive year in the top flight which from the beginning of this season is known as Eliteserien, and their 41st season in the top flight of Norwegian football. Along with the Eliteserien, the club also competed in the Norwegian Cup.

Molde finished 2nd in Eliteserien and reached the semifinal in the Norwegian Cup where the team were defeated by Lillestrøm.

Season events
On 29 December 2016, Molde announced that Mark Dempsey had returned to the club as an Assistant Manager, working alongside Erling Moe, on a -year contract.

After the season was finished, Björn Bergmann Sigurðarson was named Molde FK Player of the season by players, coaches and staff at the club. Best player in the under-23 category was Stian Rode Gregersen.

Squad

Reserve squad

Players on loan

Transfers

In

Out

Loans in

Loans out

Released

Trial

Friendlies

Competitions

Eliteserien

Results summary

Results by round

Results

Table

Norwegian Cup

Squad statistics

Appearances and goals

|-
|colspan="14"|Players away from Molde on loan:

|-
|colspan="14"|Players who left Molde during the season:

|}

Goal scorers

Disciplinary record

See also
Molde FK seasons

References

2017
Molde